Molar Peak is a steep-sided peak,  high, between Mount Camber and Copper Peak in the Osterrieth Range of Anvers Island, in the Palmer Archipelago, Antarctica. It was named by the UK Antarctic Place-Names Committee following a survey by the Falkland Islands Dependencies Survey in 1955. The descriptive name arose because the peak is shaped like a tooth.

References

Mountains of the Palmer Archipelago